Missing Foundation is the debut studio album of Missing Foundation, released in 1987 by Purge/Sound League.

Track listing

Personnel 
Adapted from Missing Foundation liner notes.

Missing Foundation
 Mark Ashwill – drums-metal
 Chris Egan – drums 
 VKP-bass
 Chris Tsakis- guitar sample
 Peter Missing – vocals / percussion
 Adam Nodelman – bass
 Mudhut-violin

Production and additional personnel
 Missing Foundation – production, [[Audio engineering
 Jim Waters – production, engineering

Release history

References

External links 
 

1987 debut albums
Missing Foundation albums
Restless Records albums